Slumgullion may refer to:
Carson Hill, California, formerly called Slumgullion
Slumgullion Pass
Slumgullion Earthflow
An alternative name for American goulash